The 2016–17 Israeli Premier League was the eighteenth season since its introduction in 1999 and the 75th season of top-tier football in Israel. It began on 20 August 2016 and ended on 20 May 2017. 

Hapoel Be'er Sheva won a back-to-back title, finishing 13 points ahead of Maccabi Tel Aviv.

Teams

A total of fourteen teams were competing in the league, including twelve sides from the 2015–16 season and two promoted teams from the 2015–16 Liga Leumit.

Maccabi Netanya and Hapoel Acre were relegated to the 2016–17 Liga Leumit after finishing the 2015–16 Israeli Premier League in the bottom two places.

F.C. Ashdod and Hapoel Ashkelon  were promoted after finishing the 2015–16 Liga Leumit in the top two places.

Stadia and locations

Personnel and sponsorship

Foreign players
The number of foreign players is restricted to six per team, while only five can be registered to a game.

In bold: Players that have been capped for their national team.
All Hapoel Tel Aviv foreign players were released due to budget cuts.

Managerial changes

Regular season

Regular season table

Regular season results

Championship round
Key numbers for pairing determination (number marks position after 26 games)

Championship round table

Championship round results

Relegation round
Key numbers for pairing determination (number marks position after 26 games)

Relegation round table

Relegation round results

Positions by round
The table lists the positions of teams after each week of matches. Note that Championship round teams will play in 36 matchdays, and the Relegation round teams will compete in only 33 matches.

Source:

Season statistics

Top scorers

Source:

Hat-tricks

Top assists

Source: (Hebrew)

Attendances
Football clubs with an average home attendance of at least 10,000:

References

External links
 uefa.com

Israeli Premier League seasons
1
Israel